Jhonnatan Guimarães Saraiva Teixeira (born February 18, 1992), simply known as Jhonnatan, is a Brazilian footballer who plays as a defensive midfielder for Paysandu.

Honours
Remo
Campeonato Paraense: 2014

Paysandu
Campeonato Paraense: 2017, 2021

References

External links
 

1992 births
Living people
Sportspeople from Belém
Brazilian footballers
Association football midfielders
Campeonato Brasileiro Série B players
Campeonato Brasileiro Série C players
Campeonato Brasileiro Série D players
Clube do Remo players
Paysandu Sport Club players
Ceará Sporting Club players
Associação Atlética Portuguesa (RJ) players
Clube Náutico Capibaribe players
Centro Sportivo Alagoano players